Michael Augustine (born December 9, 1992 in Kano) is a Nigerian footballer who last played for the New England Revolution of Major League Soccer.

Club career
Augustine began his career with Abuja and was promoted to the club’s first team in 2008. While with Abuja he scored 18 goals for the club and helped the squad gain promotion to the Nigerian Premier League in 2009.

On March 4, 2011, the New England Revolution signed Augustine from Nigerian club Abuja. He made his debut for his new team on April 26, 2011, in the Revs' 3-2 win over D.C. United in the Lamar Hunt US Open Cup, and played in several 2011 MLS Reserve Division games, before being waived by New England on June 8, 2011, having never made an MLS appearance.

References

External links
 Revolution profile

1992 births
Living people
Nigerian footballers
New England Revolution players
Expatriate soccer players in the United States
Association football midfielders
Abuja F.C. players
Sportspeople from Kano